The Photographer is a 1974 American thriller film written and directed by William Byron Hillman. The film stars Michael Callan, Barbara Nichols, Harold J. Stone, Edward Andrews, Jed Allan and Spencer Milligan. The film was released on December 5, 1974, by Embassy Pictures.

Plot
The film begins with Adrian Wilde (Michael Callan) living his life as a photographer. Everything seems normal until he stumbles upon a dead body, and takes a picture of it. This sparks a dark deep fetish Wilde has had since he saw his first dead body washed up at the local watering hole he used to play around as a child. This leads Wilde to spiral into a murderous rampage to sustain his lust for the two things he loves most: murdering unsuspecting attractive women and photography. This leads to a cat and mouse chase between the police, Lt. Luther Jacoby (Harold J. Stone) and Sgt. Sid Collins (Edward Andrews). In the end, Wilde is finally caught as he is about to maim and consume his victim. The two officers are heralded as heroes.

Cast      
Michael Callan as Adrian Wilde
Barbara Nichols as Mrs. Wilde
Harold J. Stone as Lt. Luther Jacoby
Edward Andrews as Sgt. Sid Collins
Jed Allan as Joe Hennesey
Spencer Milligan as Clinton Webber
Susan Damante as Quinn Lovette
Liv Lindeland as Mrs. Fowler
Patty Bodeen as Candy Fain
Betty Anne Rees as Karri Stephenson
Jennifer Leak as Elowise Atkins
Ronda Copland as Lisa Tuttle
Isabel Sanford as Mrs. Slade
Rai Bartonious as Murf
Billy Hillman as Young Adrian Wilde

References

External links
 
The Photographer at Letterbox DVD

1974 films
American thriller films
1970s thriller films
Embassy Pictures films
1970s English-language films
1970s American films